Last Man Stands cricket (LMS) is a form of cricket played with only 8 players per side. It originated in England in 2005. It is a 20-over (with each over lasting 5 balls) format where a pink ball is used.

Rules and regulations 
 Played with 8 players per side.
 The most distinguishing feature of this form of cricket is that if a team loses 7 wickets in an innings, the remaining batsman continues to bat without a partner, instead of being stranded (according to the normal Laws of Cricket, a batsman cannot bat without a partner). This "last man standing" can only score in even numbers of runs.

World wide recognition 
This form of cricket is most recognised due to the Last man stands feature which is contrary to the usual Laws of Cricket.

References 

Short form cricket